Pierre Bardy may refer to:
 Pierre Bardy (politician) (born 1987), Monegasque politician
 Pierre Bardy (footballer) (born 1992), French footballer